Siarhei, Siarhiej, Syarhei, or Syarhey is a Belarusian transcription of the masculine given name Sergey. Notable persons with the name include:
Siarhei Charnou (born 1979), Belarusian race walker
Siarhiej Dubaviec (born 1959), Belarusian journalist
Siarhei Kukharenka (born 1976), Belarusian judoka
Siarhei Lahun (1988–2011), Belarusian weightlifter
Siarhei Navumchyk (born 1961), Belarusian journalist and politician
Siarhei Novikau (born 1982), Belarusian judoka
Syarhei Parsyukevich (born 1967), Belarusian small business owner
Siarhei Rutenka (born 1981), Spanish handball player
Siarhei Shundzikau (born 1981), Belarusian judoka

See also
Syarhey

Belarusian masculine given names